The .450/400 Black Powder Express   cartridges were black powder rifle cartridges introduced in the United Kingdom in the 1880s.

Design
The .450/400 Black Powder Express cartridges are bottlenecked centerfire black powder express rifle cartridges produced in two case lengths, 2 inches (60.3 mm) and 3 inches (83 mm).  Both cartridges were later loaded as "Nitro for Black" cartridges, the same cartridges loaded with mild loadings of cordite carefully balanced through trial to replicate the ballistics of the black powder versions.

.450/400 2 inch Black Powder Express

.450/400 3 inch Black Powder Express

Nitro Express loadings
The .450/400 Black Powder Express cartridges served as the parent cases for the .450/400 Nitro Express cartridges, the same cartridge cases loaded with greater loads of cordite and heavier bullets to produce far more powerful rounds.

History
The .450/400 Black Powder Express in both cartridge lengths were developed in the 1880s by necking down the .450 Black Powder Express, the .450/400 2 inch Black Powder Express simply a shortened version.

Whilst obsolete, .450/400 3 inch Black Powder Express ammunition can still be purchased from ammunition manufacturers such as Kynoch.

Use
The .450/400 Black Powder Express in both case lengths were considered good deerstalking cartridges and was usually chambered in a lightweight stalking rifle.

See also
 Express (weaponry)
 List of rifle cartridges
 10 mm caliber

References

External links

 Ammo-One, ".450/400 B.P.E. 3 inch", ammo-one.com , retrieved 8 November 2017.
 Cartridgecollector, .450/400 2 " Black Powder Express, cartridgecollector.net, retrieved 17 Dec 16.
 Cartridgecollector, .450/400 2 " Nitro for Black Powder, cartridgecollector.net, retrieved 17 Dec 16.
 Cartridgecollector, .450/400 3 " Black Powder Express, cartridgecollector.net, retrieved 17 Dec 16.
 Cartridgecollector, .450/400 3 " Nitro for Black Powder, cartridgecollector.net, retrieved 17 Dec 16.
 The Spanish Association of Cartridge Collectors, ".450-400 Express 2 inch", municon.org , retrieved 8 November 2017.

Pistol and rifle cartridges
British firearm cartridges